Seui (Sardinian and ) is a comune (municipality) in the Province of South Sardinia in the Italian region Sardinia, located about  north of Cagliari and about  southwest of Tortolì.

Seui borders the following municipalities: Arzana, Escalaplano, Esterzili, Gairo, Perdasdefogu, Sadali, Seulo, Ulassai, Ussassai.

Demographic evolution

References

Cities and towns in Sardinia